SUNY Maritime may refer to:

 State University of New York Maritime College
 SUNY Maritime, the former ; acquired by the State University of New York Maritime College after decommissioned by the U.S. Navy in 2002